Golden Best may refer to:
 Golden Best: 15th Anniversary, an album by Zard
Golden Best (sometimes stylized as GOLDEN☆BEST), common name for Japanese artist compilations.
Golden Best (Mari Hamada album)
Golden Best (Yōsui Inoue album)
Golden Best (Pink Lady album)